The title of megas archōn ("grand archon") was a Byzantine court title during the 13th–14th centuries.

History and functions 
The title of megas archōn appears originally as a translation of foreign titles, with the meaning of "grand prince"; thus in the middle of the 10th century Emperor Constantine VII Porphyrogennetos calls the Magyar ruler Árpád as "great prince of Tourkia [Hungary]" in chapter 40 of his De Administrando Imperio. 

The Nicaean emperor Theodore II Laskaris first established it as a specific court rank, originally designating the highest-ranking officer of the emperor's retinue. By the time pseudo-Kodinos wrote his Book of Offices in the mid-14th century, however, it had become a purely honorific dignity without any duties attached. In the Book of Offices, the post is listed in the 35th place of the imperial hierarchy, between the prōtospatharios and the tatas tēs aulēs, but other contemporary lists of offices (e.g. the appendix to the Hexabiblos), which reflect the usage during the late reign of Andronikos II Palaiologos or during the reign of Andronikos III Palaiologos, place him in the 38th place. The list of Xeropot. 191 places him in 34th in the hierarchy, while in the list of office given in the 15th-century manuscript Paris. gr. 1783, the title is missing. His ceremonial costume is given by pseudo-Kodinos as follows: a gold-embroidered skiadion hat, a plain silk kabbadion kaftan, and a skaranikon (domed hat) covered in golden and lemon-yellow silk and decorated with gold wire and images of the emperor in front and rear, respectively depicted enthroned and on horseback. He bore no staff of office (dikanikion).

Known holders

References

Sources 
 
 
 
 

Byzantine court titles